Gornji Vrh (in older sources also Gorenji Vrh) is a small dispersed settlement in the Municipality of Šmartno pri Litiji in central Slovenia. The area is part of the historical region of Lower Carniola and is now included in the Central Slovenia Statistical Region.

History
In 2013, the settlement of Razbore – katastrska občina Poljane – del (literally, 'part of Razbore in the cadastral community of Poljane') was annexed by Gornji Vrh. The territory had formerly been part of the neighboring settlement of Razbore in the neighboring Municipality of Trebnje.

References

External links
Gornji Vrh at Geopedia

Populated places in the Municipality of Šmartno pri Litiji